

80001–80100 

|-id=008
| 80008 Danielarhodes ||  || Daniela Rhodes (born 1946) is an Italian chemical engineer working in scientific research. She was elected Member and Chair of the European Molecular Biology Organization Council and since 2007 has been a Fellow of the Royal Society. || 
|}

80101–80200 

|-id=135
| 80135 Zanzanini ||  || Giuseppe Zan Zanini (1794–1869) lived in Val Bavona and Val Foiòi in Ticino, Switzerland. His history is a symbol of the hard life and fragile existence supported by the valley inhabitants of Ticino in 1800. || 
|-id=179
| 80179 Václavknoll || 1999 VK ||  (1964–2010) was a Czech astronomer and promoter and popularizer of astronomy, natural sciences and technologies in the Czech city and region of Pardubice and particularly for young people. Since 1994 he has been the chief of the Pardubice's observatory of Baron Arthur Kraus. || 
|-id=180
| 80180 Elko || 1999 VS || The city of Elko in Nevada, United States, home of the National Basque Festival and the Cowboy Poetry Gathering || 
|-id=184
| 80184 Hekigoto ||  || Hekigoto Kawahigashi (1873–1937), was a Japanese Haiku poet. He started to compose Haiku at the age of sixteen, inspired by the highly renowned Haiku poet Shiki Masaoka. He later became absorbed in free style Haiku and co-founded the avant-garde Haiku journal So-un. || 
|}

80201–80300 

|-bgcolor=#f2f2f2
| colspan=4 align=center | 
|}

80301–80400 

|-bgcolor=#f2f2f2
| colspan=4 align=center | 
|}

80401–80500 

|-id=451
| 80451 Alwoods || 2000 AA || Alfred Lee Woods (1911–2004) was American amateur astronomer at the St. Louis Astronomical Society || 
|}

80501–80600 

|-bgcolor=#f2f2f2
| colspan=4 align=center | 
|}

80601–80700 

|-id=652
| 80652 Albertoangela || 2000 BB || Alberto Angela (born 1962) is a well-known Italian science writer and the host of a number of popular television programs on science, technology and the environment. || 
|-id=675
| 80675 Kwentus ||  || Peter Kwentus (1923–1985) and Virginia Kwentus (1929–2008), members and devoted supporters of the Warren Astronomical Society in Michigan. || 
|}

80701–80800 

|-bgcolor=#f2f2f2
| colspan=4 align=center | 
|}

80801–80900 

|-
| 80801 Yiwu ||  || Yiwu county, Xinjiang Uyghur Autonomous Region, Northwest China, where many shadow chasers observed the total solar eclipse of 2008  August || 
|-id=807
| 80807 Jimloudon ||  || James "Jim" Loudon (1944–1988), American space-science lecturer with the University of Michigan || 
|-id=808
| 80808 Billmason ||  || Bill Mason (born 1932), an adhesives and corrosion chemist. || 
|-id=810
| 80810 Georgewinters ||  || George Winters (born 1950) is the former Secretary of the Association of Paleontological Suppliers (AAPS) and recipient of the prestigious Sternberg Medal from the AAPS in 2018. || 
|}

80901–81000 

|-id=984
| 80984 Santomurakami ||  || Santo Murakami (1912–2005), a Japanese calligrapher and recipient of the Order of Cultural Merit Award in 1998 || 
|}

References 

080001-081000